The Harlem Playgirls was an African American swing band active in the Midwest and throughout the United States from the mid-1930s to the early 1940s.

History
Organized by Milwaukee-based drummer and band leader Sylvester Rice (1905–1984) in 1935 and drawing from members of the popular Dixie Sweethearts, the group toured TOBA circuits, performing in picture houses, jazz clubs, ballrooms and variety theatres. In the tradition of prior all-female bands led by musical theater stars, headliners Eddie Crump and Neliska Ann "Baby" Briscoe both led the band as dancing, singing front women. Briscoe had gained prominence in New Orleans and had worked with Lil Hardin Armstrong’s all-female band and Joe Robichaux and his Rhythm Boys. Trombonist Lela Julius and saxophonist Vi Burnside were two of the group’s leading soloists. The group appeared at the Apollo Theater in New York City in 1937 and competed in the prestigious battle of the bands contest at Chicago’s Savoy ballroom against Johnny Long’s group in 1938. Many members later went on to perform with the International Sweethearts of Rhythm and the Prairie View Co-eds.

See also 
 Stecker Bros.

References

Sources 

F. Driggs. 1977. “Women in Jazz, A Survey” Liner Notes to Jazz women, A Feminist Retrospective. New York: Stash Records.

H. Rye: “What the Papers said: the Harlem Play-Girls and Dixie Rhythm Girls (and Dixie Sweethearts),” Storyville 1996/7, ed. L. Wright (Chigwell, England, 1997)
S. Tucker. Swing Shift: All-Girl Bands of the 1940s. (Durham, NC: Duke University Press 200).
L. Wright: “Pieces of the Jigsaw: Harlem Playgirls,” Storyville 1998/9 (Chigwell, England, 1999), 178

Musical groups established in 1935
Musical groups disestablished in the 1940s
African-American girl groups
African-American musical groups
American girl groups
American swing musical groups